Philotarsetae is an infraorder of bark lice in the order Psocodea (formerly Psocoptera), within the suborder Psocomorpha.

Families
These three families belong to the infraorder Philotarsetae:
 Philotarsidae Pearman, 1936 (loving barklice)
 Pseudocaeciliidae Pearman, 1936 (false lizard barklice)
 Trichopsocidae Pearman, 1936 (lash-faced psocids)

Sources

Insect infraorders
Psocomorpha